Samuel Adams (June 5, 1805 – February 27, 1850) was an American politician who served as acting governor of Arkansas from April to November 1844.

Early life
Adams was born in Halifax County, Virginia. He moved to Arkansas in 1835, where he became a planter and was active in state politics.

Political career
Adams was a Democrat, and was elected to the Arkansas Senate in 1840. He was reelected and served as president of the Senate during his second term. On April 29, 1844, Governor Archibald Yell resigned from his office to run for the U.S. House of Representatives. Adams, who was president of the Arkansas Senate at that time, became Acting Governor of Arkansas and served until November 5, 1844. During his short term he focused on internal improvements and education, and left a surplus in the state treasury when he left office. In 1846, Adams was elected to the office of State Treasurer and served in that position until his death.

Death
Samuel Adams died in Saline County, Arkansas. He is buried in the historic Mount Holly Cemetery in Little Rock, Arkansas.

Personal life
Adams was the stepfather of Civil War General James Fleming Fagan.

Legacy
An engraving of Samuel Adams graced Arkansas Civil War treasury notes as well as he devoted Arkansas freedom.

See also 
 List of governors of Arkansas

References

External links 

 

1805 births
1850 deaths
19th-century American politicians
Acting Governors of Arkansas
American planters
American slave owners
Democratic Party Arkansas state senators
Burials at Mount Holly Cemetery
Democratic Party governors of Arkansas
People from Halifax County, Virginia
State treasurers of Arkansas